Imran Khan, a retired Pakistani cricketer and former Prime Minister of Pakistan, took 24 five-wicket hauls during his career in international cricket. In cricket, a five-wicket haul (also known as a "five–for" or "fifer") refers to a bowler taking five or more wickets in a single innings. This is regarded as a notable achievement, and as of 2014 fewer than 45 bowlers have taken more than 15 five-wicket hauls at international level in their cricketing careers. A right-arm fast bowler who represented his country between 1971 and 1992, Khan was described by the BBC as "one of the finest fast bowlers cricket has ever seen", while ESPNcricinfo declared him as "the greatest cricketer to emerge from Pakistan, and arguably the world's second-best allrounder after Garry Sobers". In 1983 he was named as one of the five Cricketers of the Year by the Wisden Cricketers' Almanack, and was inducted into the ICC Cricket Hall of Fame in January 2009.

Khan made his Test debut in 1971 against England at Edgbaston Cricket Ground. His first Test five-wicket haul came in 1977 against Australia in a match at Melbourne Cricket Ground which Pakistan lost. In the same year, he took his first pair of five-wicket hauls in a single match against Australia at the Sydney Cricket Ground. By the end of his career, he had claimed five-wickets hauls in both innings of a match on three occasions. His career-best figures for an innings were 8 wickets for 58 runs against Sri Lanka at Gaddafi Stadium, in March 1982. He took ten or more wickets in a match on six occasions.

Having made his One Day International (ODI) debut in August 1974 against England at Trent Bridge, Nottingham, Khan's solitary ODI five-wicket haul came in 1985 against India in a match at the Sharjah Cricket Association Stadium which Pakistan lost. He took 6 wickets for 14 runs in the match, which was his career-best bowling in ODI cricket. By the time he retired from international cricket in 1992 after nearly 21 years, Khan had taken 23 five-wicket hauls in Test cricket and one in ODIs. , he is fifteenth overall among all-time combined five-wicket haul takers, a position which he shares with Sydney Barnes, Kapil Dev and Dennis Lillee.

Key

Tests

One Day Internationals

Notes

References

External links
 

Imran Khan
Khan
Imran Khan